Landeyjahöfn, also previously referred to as Bakkafjöruhöfn, is a roll-on/roll-off ferry terminal and harbour serving the Herjólfur ferry to Vestmannaeyjar island. It was constructed specifically for the purpose of reducing the sailing distance from Vestmannaeyjar to the mainland. The harbour was opened on the 21st of July 2010. It has a main ferrry dock and terminal as well as a dock for smaller boats. The harbour is around 140 km from Reykjavík.

Previously, the Herjólfur ferry sailed to Þorlákshöfn, taking around 3 hours, now only taking around 30 minutes. The distance from Landeyjahöfn to Vestmannaeyjar is now only around 12 km, in contrast to 75 km to Þorlákshöfn.

Being constructed on sand, it has had considerable issues with sand/silt buildup and needs to be dredged regularly.

Ship-to-shore connection 
In August 2020, an electric ferry charging station was installed to charge the new hybrid-electric Herjólfur ferry. When sailing between Vestmannaeyjar and Landeyjahöfn, it runs purely on electricity.

The charger couples automatically with the ferry once it has docked and charges the ferry in 30 minutes while loading/unloading passengers and goods, with a power output of 2.5MW. The ferry has a 3MWh battery.

References

Ferry terminals